"Te Me Vas" (English: "You Are Going") is a 2012 song by American singer Prince Royce. The song was released in December 2012 as the third and final single taken from Royce's second studio album, Phase II (2012). It received a Lo Nuestro nomination for Tropical Song of the Year.

Music video
The music video for "Te Me Vas" was released in August 2013.

Charts

Awards and nominations

See also
 List of Billboard number-one Latin songs of 2013
 List of number-one Billboard Tropical Songs of 2013

References

2012 singles
2012 songs
Prince Royce songs
Songs written by Prince Royce
Top Stop Music singles